Radial Road 7 is a network of roads in Metro Manila, connecting the cities of Manila, Quezon City and Caloocan, as well as San Jose del Monte and the municipality of Norzagaray in the province of Bulacan. The road is one of 10 radial roads in Metro Manila that connect the City of Manila with various provinces.

Route description

Lerma Street
Lerma Street is an 8-lane road connecting Quezon Boulevard (R-8) and España Boulevard in Sampaloc, Manila.

España Boulevard

España Boulevard is an 8-lane road starting from the junction of Lerma Avenue and Nicanor Reyes Street, ending in the Mabuhay Rotonda (otherwise known as Welcome Rotonda) in Quezon City. It passes through the northernmost areas of the University Belt, including the University of Santo Tomas and Ramon Magsaysay High School. Past RMHS, it passes through the mostly residential and commercial area of Sampaloc.

Quezon Avenue

Quezon Avenue starts from the Mabuhay Rotunda and ends in the Elliptical Road. It is one of the most important thoroughfares of Quezon City. It runs through the center of the city, lined with palm trees, government buildings, and nightclubs. It uses an interchange system on most of its intersections. This road used to be one of the most comfortable roads in the area, but had been extremely prone to heavy traffic since the construction of the G. Araneta Avenue Underpass.

Elliptical Road

Elliptical Road is an 8-lane roundabout that circumscribes Quezon City Memorial Circle. R-7 continues at Commonwealth Avenue.

Commonwealth Avenue

Commonwealth Avenue starts from Elliptical Road as an 18-lane highway, the widest road in the Philippines. It ends with a junction with the Quirino Highway.

Quirino Highway

R-7 becomes the Quirino Highway and passes through barangays Kaligayahan, Pasong Putik Proper, and Greater Lagro in Quezon City. This is the portion of R-7 that enters the city of San Jose Del Monte in Bulacan via North Caloocan.

Villarama Road
Also known as the San Jose Del Monte–Norzagaray Road, Quirino Highway becomes this road after crossing Dr. E. Roquero Avenue in San Jose del Monte. This is the last segment of the Radial Road 7, which ends with a junction with Angat–Norzagaray Road in Norzagaray.

Future

Metro Rail Transit Line 7, which will run along R-7 along Commonwealth and Quirino Avenues through Regalado Highway, is under construction.

The future North Luzon East Expressway will also be a part of Radial Road 7 when its construction is finalized.

See also
 List of roads in Metro Manila

References

Routes in Metro Manila